Leon Redbone (born Dickran Gobalian; August 26, 1949 – May 30, 2019) was a singer-songwriter and musician specializing in jazz, blues, and Tin Pan Alley classics. Recognized by his hat (often a Panama hat), dark sunglasses, and black tie, Redbone was born in Cyprus of Armenian ancestry and first appeared on stage in Toronto, Canada, in the early 1970s. He also appeared on film and television in acting and voice-over roles.

In concert Redbone often employed comedy and demonstrated his skill in guitar playing. Recurrent gags involved the influence of alcohol and claiming to have written works originating well before he was born – Redbone favored material from the Tin Pan Alley era, circa 1890 to 1910. He sang the theme to the 1980s television series Mr. Belvedere and released eighteen albums.

Early life
Redbone was elusive about his origins, and he never explained the origin of his stage name.  According to a Toronto Star report in the 1980s, he was once known as Dickran Gobalian, came to Canada in the mid-1960s, and changed his name via the Ontario Change of Name Act.  Biographical research published in 2019 corroborated his birth name, and stated that his family was of Armenian origin. His parents lived in Jerusalem, but left in 1948 for Nicosia, Cyprus, where Redbone was born.  By 1961, the family had moved to London, England, and by 1965 to Toronto.

Career
While living in Canada in the late 1960s, Redbone began performing in public at Toronto area nightclubs and folk music festivals. He met Bob Dylan at the Mariposa Folk Festival in 1972. Dylan was so impressed by Redbone's performance that he mentioned it in a Rolling Stone interview, leading that magazine to do a feature article on Redbone a year before he had a recording contract. The article described his performances as "so authentic you can hear the surface noise [of an old 78 rpm]." Dylan said that if he had ever started a label, he would have signed Redbone. His first album, On the Track, was released by Warner Bros. Records in 1975.

He was introduced to a larger public as a semi-regular musical guest on NBC's Saturday Night Live, appearing twice in the first season.  During the 1980s and '90s he was a frequent guest on The Tonight Show Starring Johnny Carson. He was also a guest on A Prairie Home Companion.

A self-taught musician, he played by ear, sometimes changing the chords of established tunes, never rehearsing with a band, and not following set lists.  In an interview in the Winter 2017 edition (No. 177) of BING magazine, the publication of the International Club Crosby, clarinetist Dan Levinson recounted working with Redbone:I toured with Redbone for 12 years.  We used to listen to early Crosby while we were on the road.   [Redbone's] taste in music was more eclectic than that of anyone I've ever known -- it included Emmett Miller, Blind Blake, Paganini, Caruso, Gene Austin, John McCormack, Moran and Mack, Cliff Edwards, Jelly Roll Morton, Ted Lewis, Mustafa the Castrato, the Hungarian singer Imre Laszlo, Jimmie Rodgers ('the Singing Brakeman'), Mongolian throat singers, W. C. Fields, Laurel and Hardy ... and early Bing Crosby.

Redbone was described as "both a musical artist and a performance artist whose very identity was part of his creative output."  He usually dressed in attire reminiscent of the Vaudeville era, performing in a Panama hat with a black band and dark sunglasses, often while sitting at attention on a stool, with a white coat and trousers and a black string tie.   With his reluctance to discuss his past came speculation that "Leon Redbone" was an alternative identity for another performer.  Two common suggestions in years past were Andy Kaufman and Frank Zappa, both of whom Redbone outlived. Though sometimes compared to Zappa and Tom Waits for "the strength and strangeness of his persona", he exclusively played music from decades before the rock era, and disdained "blatant sound for people to dance to".  In a 1991 interview, he said: "The only thing that interests me is history, reviewing the past and making something out of it."

Redbone survived a small plane crash in Clarksburg, West Virginia, on February 12, 1979. He traveled to engagements exclusively by car, saying, "I carry around many unusual items and devices. They make life difficult for airport security personnel and flying impossible for me."

On May 19, 2015 on his website, his publicist referred to concerns about his health and announced his retirement from performing and recording.

Death
Redbone died on May 30, 2019, following complications from dementia.  At the time of his death he was living in Bucks County, Pennsylvania, in hospice care. He was survived by his wife Beryl Handler, daughters Blake and Ashley, and three grandchildren.

A statement on Redbone's website noted his death with cheeky humor: "It is with heavy hearts we announce that early this morning, May 30, 2019, Leon Redbone crossed the delta for that beautiful shore at the age of 127. He departed our world with his guitar, his trusty companion Rover, and a simple tip of his hat." His longtime publicist Jim Della Croce confirmed that his age was, in fact, 69.

Appearances in other media
One of Redbone's songs, "Seduced", was featured prominently in the 1978 film The Big Fix. Redbone sang "Baby, It's Cold Outside" with Zooey Deschanel over the closing credits of the 2003 film Elf  and provided the voice for Leon the Snowman in the film. On his 1987 album Christmas Island he performed "Frosty the Snowman" with Dr. John. He performed the theme song for the TV shows Mr. Belvedere and Harry and the Hendersons.

Redbone appeared regularly on the PBS children's show Between the Lions. On Sesame Street, Redbone sang several songs over film footage, including "Blueberry Mouth", "Have You Ever", and "What Do They Do When They Go Wherever They Go?"  He also appeared as Leon in the 1988 film Candy Mountain, and on an episode of the TV show Life Goes On. He narrated the 2011 Emmy Award-winning documentary Remembering the Scranton Sirens, celebrating the exceptional, yet little-known, musical legacy of one of the most significant "territory" dance bands in American musical history.

Redbone performed in several TV commercials, including Budweiser beer, in which he lay on a surfboard singing "This Bud's for You", the U.S. automobile brand Chevrolet, All laundry detergent, and InterCity British Rail service in which he sang the song "Relax". He also lent his voice to an animated caricature of himself in a commercial for Ken-L Ration dog food.

Redbone is the subject of the 2018 short documentary film Please Don't Talk About Me When I'm Gone, by Mako Funasaka, Liam Romalis and Jason Charters, produced by Riddle Films.

Discography
Source:

Studio albums

 On the Track (Warner Bros., 1975; #87 Billboard, gold record)
 Double Time (Warner Bros., 1977; #38)
 Champagne Charlie (Warner Bros., 1978; #163)
 From Branch to Branch (Atco, 1981; #152)
 Red to Blue (Sugar Hill, 1985)
 Christmas Island (August, 1988)
 No Regrets (Blue Thumb, 1988)
 Christmas Island (Universal Music Canada, 1988)
 Sugar (Rounder, 1990)
 Up a Lazy River (Blue Thumb, 1992)
 Whistling in the Wind (Private Music, 1994)
 Any Time (Rounder, 2001)
 Flying By (August, 2014)
 Long Way from Home: Early Recordings (Third Man, 2016) (reached No. 10 on the Billboard 200)

Compilation albums
 Rhino Hi-Five: Leon Redbone (Rhino, 2007)

Live albums
 Live & Kickin (Purple Pyramid / Cleopatra, 1981) ;
 Mystery Man (Accord Records, 1982) ;
 Leon Redbone Live (Green Stone Records, 1985) ;
 Live! (truncated version of 1985 release) (Pair, 1991) ;
 Live – October 26, 1992: The Olympia Theater, Paris, France (Rounder, 2005) ;
 Strings & Jokes: Live in Bremen 1977 (MIG, 2018) ;
 If We Ever Meet Again (Concert Archive-Delta-Special Markets,2021).

References

External links

 Leon Redbone Tribute Channel at youtube.com

1949 births
2019 deaths
Deaths from dementia in Pennsylvania
20th-century guitarists
20th-century American male singers
20th-century American singers
21st-century guitarists
21st-century American male musicians
Acoustic guitarists
American blues guitarists
American blues singer-songwriters
American blues singers
Cypriot guitarists
Cypriot people of Armenian descent
Cypriot emigrants to the United States
American harmonica players
American jazz guitarists
American jazz singers
American male guitarists
American male jazz musicians
American male singer-songwriters
Private Music artists
Warner Records artists
Rounder Records artists
Third Man Records artists
Singer-songwriters from Pennsylvania